Gerroidea is a superfamily of semiaquatic bugs in the order Hemiptera. There are at least 3 families and more than 2,000 described species in Gerroidea.

Families
These three families belong to the superfamily Gerroidea:
 Gerridae Leach, 1815 (water striders)
 Hermatobatidae Coutière & Martin, 1901
 Veliidae Amyot & Serville, 1843 (smaller water striders or riffle bugs)

References

Further reading

External links

 

 
Gerromorpha
Hemiptera superfamilies